Triptane, or 2,2,3-trimethylbutane, is an organic chemical compound with the molecular formula C7H16 or (H3C-)3C-C(-CH3)2H. It is therefore an alkane, specifically the most compact and heavily branched of the heptane isomers, the only one with a butane (C4) backbone. 

Triptane is commonly used as an anti-knock additive in aviation fuels.

See also
List of gasoline additives

References

Hydrocarbons
Alkanes